Nation Radio East Yorkshire, Formerly GHR Hull & East Yorkshire and KCFM, is an Independent Local Radio station serving Kingston upon Hull and the East Riding of Yorkshire. This new licence was advertised by Ofcom in 2006. 

As KCFM, it was owned by the Lincs FM Group. In early 2019, it was sold on to Nation Broadcasting, under the licensed name of Greatest Hits Radio. On 19 September 2022, the licensing name agreement ended and the station became part of the Nation Radio network.

As of December 2022, the station broadcasts to a weekly audience of 59,000, according to RAJAR.

Background
KCFM was run by a local consortium – under the name of Planet Broadcasting Limited. In June 2009 a share exchange was agreed with the Lincs FM Group.

Tim Jibson who was a member of the team that acquired the original Ofcom licence, was the launch director and was also the Director of Programmes until May 2009, has now moved on to the role of managing director of Adventures in Radio Ltd. Jibson had previously worked for Viking FM, and Viking Gold – subsequently known as Classic Gold, Great Yorkshire Gold, Great Yorkshire Radio, Magic 1161, Viking 2 and currently Greatest Hits Radio – and BBC Radio Humberside.

Launch
The station carried out a full month of test transmissions before launch at 6:00 a.m. on 1 August 2007. The first voice heard on-air was that of Steve Jordan who then introduced the Director of Programmes Tim Jibson. Jordan then played the first music track "Twist and Shout" by The Beatles. The Planet House studio building was then officially opened by the England Football Manager Steve McClaren.

Programming
As KCFM, the station played a variety of music, ranging from the 1960s to current chart hits. Its final line-up of daytime presenters was Sean Gerard, Tim West and Matt Hutchinson; the latter remaining into the GHR era as the sole local host. KCFM provided coverage of local news and sport – including commentaries of Hull City and the two Super League teams – Hull Kingston Rovers and Hull F.C. – along with updates of ice hockey, amateur rugby league and other local sports.

Technical

Transmission
The station broadcasts on 99.8 MHz FM. Its transmission area covers the City of Kingston upon Hull and the neighbouring towns of Beverley, Driffield and Goole in East Yorkshire and Barton-upon-Humber in North Lincolnshire – from a transmitter mast on top of the Humber Bridge's north pier. KCFM is also available via DAB, launching on that platform in October 2016. In early 2019 KCFM moved DAB multiplexes from the Lincolnshire multiplex to Bauer's Humberside multiplex offering a better fit with its FM distribution, albeit only in mono owing to space limitations.

Studios
A purpose built studio complex was constructed at "Planet House" on Hedon Road in Hull. Studio Design was carried out by Bob Corn of the Corn Tarrant Partnership – Technical Installation by Radio Studio Services – which is headed up by Richard Lawley. The station is now based at Parkgate House, Hesslewood Country Office Park, Hessle.

Branding
KCFM's first jingle package were re-sings of a KVIL package produced by radio ident company TM Studios in Dallas, Texas, USA. A custom made news jingle was also commissioned.

In late 2010, KCFM aired new jingles made by the UK based jingle company S2Blue. The station's last jingle package was produced by Audio Sweets and matched the rest of the Lincs FM group of stations.

References

External links
 
 Licence award
 Yorkshire Post article

Radio stations in Yorkshire
East Riding of Yorkshire
Mass media in Kingston upon Hull
Radio broadcasting companies of the United Kingdom
Nation Broadcasting
Radio stations established in 2007